Zagrodno  is a village in Złotoryja County, Lower Silesian Voivodeship, in south-western Poland. It is the seat of the administrative district (gmina) called Gmina Zagrodno. Prior to 1945 it was in Germany.

References

Zagrodno